Maria Nowak may refer to:

 Maria Nowak (economist) (1935–2022), Polish-French economist
 Maria Nowak (politician) (born 1950), Polish politician